Bangladesh Qawmi Madrasa Education Commission is a commission formed by the Government of Bangladesh on 15 April 2012 to give official recognition to education certificate of Qawmi Madrasas. The commission had 17 members with Shah Ahmad Shafi as its chairman. After the formation of the commission, the activities of the commission came to a standstill for various reasons including disagreement and movement of Hefazat-e-Islam Bangladesh. In the meantime, the ‘Bangladesh Qawmi Madrasa Education Authority Act, 2013’ could not be implemented in the face of opposition. On 27 September 2016, the government again took the initiative to recognize the education certificate of Qawmi Madrasa. For this a 9-member review committee was formed. Later, the term of the commission was extended by activating the previous 17-member committee. On the recommendations of the commission, the ‘Equivalent to Master's Degree (Islamic Studies and Arabic) in the Certificate of Dawra-e Hadith (Takmil) of Qawmi Madrasas under ‘Al-Haiatul Ulya Lil-Jamiatil Qawmia Bangladesh’, 2018’ was passed in 2018.

See also
Befaqul Madarisil Arabia Bangladesh
Al-Haiatul Ulya Lil-Jamiatil Qawmia Bangladesh

References

External links
Qawmi Madrasa Act’ 2018

Farid Uddin Masood
Qawmi madrasas of Bangladesh
Deobandi Islamic universities and colleges
2012 establishments in Bangladesh
Government commissions of Bangladesh
Higher education in Bangladesh